Ju Zhen (born 10 May 1989) is a Chinese goalball player. She won a silver medal at both the 2012 and 2016 Summer Paralympics.

Like her national teammates Lin Shan, Fan Feifei, and Wang Ruixue, Ju Zhen started playing the sport under coach Wang Jinqin at the Weifang School of the Blind in Weifang, Shandong province.

References

Female goalball players
1989 births
Living people
Sportspeople from Shandong
People from Weifang
Paralympic goalball players of China
Paralympic silver medalists for China
Goalball players at the 2012 Summer Paralympics
Goalball players at the 2016 Summer Paralympics
Medalists at the 2016 Summer Paralympics
Medalists at the 2012 Summer Paralympics
Paralympic medalists in goalball
21st-century Chinese women